Arena Williams (born 1990) is a New Zealand politician. As of 2020, she is a Member of Parliament in the House of Representatives for the Labour Party.

Early life and career
Williams has affiliation to Te Aitanga-a-Māhaki, Ngāi Tūhoe and Ngāi Tahu. She studied law and commerce at the University of Auckland, and was active within the Princes Street Labour. In 2012 she was president of the Auckland University Students' Association. In 2012 she and other university students staged a campus protest to highlight the issue of rising student debt. The under-dressed students begged people passing on the street for clothing, graphically depicting how students have to "borrow to live".

Williams began her career working as a probations officer in Panmure, encountering many people in the court system for relatively minor offences, prompting her advocacy for justice reform.

Political career

Aged 24 she was Labour's youngest candidate at that election.

In November 2019 Williams was appointed as a member of the Waitematā District Health Board.

The selection was scheduled to be held on 21 March 2020, but was delayed due to a complaint about whether some new party electorate branch members lived in Manurewa and were eligible to vote in the selection process. In May, Wall's partner and lawyer Prue Kapua contacted the national party council, claiming that Williams's application was late, and warned that legal action would be taken if it was not rejected. The selection was rescheduled to 30 May, but Wall withdrew her application on 29 May, to instead run as a list-only candidate. Williams was selected as the Labour candidate.

During the 2020 general election held on 17 October, she beat National candidate Nuwi Samarakone by a margin of 17,179 votes. Williams is one of twenty-three new Labour Party MPs in the 53rd Parliament.

Controversies

Kāinga Ora advertisement
In November 2021, Kāinga Ora drew controversy after Newshub and Radio New Zealand reported that the agency had used Williams (a Labour Party candidate) in a taxpayer funded advertisement in 2020, compromising its political neutrality. Kāinga Ora drew criticism from Housing Minister Megan Woods and deputy Opposition Leader Nicola Willis on the grounds of professionalism and compromising its political neutrality. Woods subsequently reported the agency to the Public Service Commission. The National Party called for an investigation into Kāinga Ora, alleging a cover up and "culture of deceit." Williams had informed Kāinga Ora of her political ambitions prior to the advertorial featuring her was paid for and published.

References

1990 births
Living people
University of Auckland alumni
New Zealand Māori women lawyers
Waitemata District Health Board members
Unsuccessful candidates in the 2014 New Zealand general election
Candidates in the 2020 New Zealand general election
New Zealand Labour Party MPs
New Zealand MPs for Auckland electorates
Members of the New Zealand House of Representatives
21st-century New Zealand women politicians
Women members of the New Zealand House of Representatives
Māori MPs
Te Aitanga-a-Māhaki people
Ngāi Tūhoe people
Ngāi Tahu people
21st-century New Zealand lawyers